Jean Anderson Adel Bruano Langue (born 17 September 1997) is a Mauritian international footballer who plays for Spanish club Deportivo Alavés as a midfielder.

Club career
Born in Quatre Bornes, he began his career with Cercle de Joachim. In 2018 he signed for French club Paris FC, and in August 2018 he signed for Spanish club Deportivo Alavés.

International career
He made his international debut for Mauritius in 2015.

References

1997 births
Living people
Mauritian footballers
Mauritius international footballers
Cercle de Joachim SC players
Paris FC players
Deportivo Alavés players
Association football midfielders
Mauritian expatriate footballers
Mauritian expatriates in France
Expatriate footballers in France
Mauritian expatriates in Spain
Expatriate footballers in Spain